Lovell T. "Bill" Underwood (December 13, 1902 – July 13, 1997) was a college basketball coach, the head coach at Gonzaga University for two seasons, from 1949 to 1951, with an overall record of 26–33. Underwood resigned as head basketball coach in March 1951,  and was succeeded by Hank Anderson, who stayed for 21 years.

Underwood was a high school basketball All-American in 1922 in Lexington, Kentucky. He  earned three letters in basketball at the University of Kentucky in Lexington in 1924, 1925, and 1926. He coached at Transylvania University in Lexington in the early 1930s and moved west to Yakima, Washington, in 1938, where he resided when he was hired by Gonzaga in May 1949. He was also the Gonzaga Bulldogs baseball coach from 1949 to 1950.

Underwood stayed in Spokane and was an administrator in the county school system; he became the Spokane chapter manager of the Red Cross in 1959. He later served with the organization in Japan. Underwood died in Bellevue in 1997 at age 94.

Head coaching record

Basketball

References

External links
 Gonzaga University Digital Collections – Bill Underwood

1902 births
1997 deaths
Centers (basketball)
Forwards (basketball)
Gonzaga Bulldogs baseball coaches
Gonzaga Bulldogs men's basketball coaches
Kentucky Wildcats men's basketball players
Sportspeople from Lexington, Kentucky
Transylvania Pioneers men's basketball coaches
American men's basketball players
Basketball coaches from Kentucky
Basketball players from Lexington, Kentucky